Peter Nicholas (born 21 August 1963) is a New Zealand sailor. He competed in the men's 470 event at the 2000 Summer Olympics.

References

External links
 

1963 births
Living people
New Zealand male sailors (sport)
Olympic sailors of New Zealand
Sailors at the 2000 Summer Olympics – 470
Sportspeople from Taupō